Susana Guízar (1922–1997) was a Mexican film actress.

Selected filmography
 Neither Blood Nor Sand (1941)
 Jesusita in Chihuahua (1942)
 The Two Orphans (1944)
 Lady Windermere's Fan (1944)
 The House of the Fox (1945)
 The Associate (1946)
 Madam Temptation (1948)
 Dawn of Life (1950)

References

Bibliography
 Isabel Arredondo. Motherhood in Mexican Cinema, 1941-1991: The Transformation of Femininity on Screen. McFarland, 2013.

External links

1922 births
1997 deaths
Mexican film actresses
Actresses from Michoacán
People from Pátzcuaro